Grass Pond is a small lake south-southwest of Stillwater in Herkimer County, New York. It drains south via an unnamed creek which flows into the Independence River.

See also
 List of lakes in New York

References 

Lakes of New York (state)
Lakes of Herkimer County, New York